The Lockwood Barn is located in Rutland, Wisconsin.

History
The barn was designed by Sereno W. Graves, who later became a member of the Wisconsin State Assembly. Graves also designed the Samuel Hunt House and the Daniel Pond Farmhouse, along with designing and residing in the Sereno W. Graves House, which are also located in Rutland. The barn was listed on the National Register of Historic Places in 1982 and on the State Register of Historic Places in 1989.

References

Barns on the National Register of Historic Places in Wisconsin
National Register of Historic Places in Dane County, Wisconsin
Limestone buildings in the United States
Buildings and structures completed in 1855